Lulworth Cove is a cove near the village of West Lulworth, on the Jurassic Coast in Dorset, southern England. The cove is one of the world's finest examples of such a landform, and is a World Heritage Site and tourist location with approximately 500,000 visitors every year, of whom about 30 per cent visit in July and August. It is close to the rock arch of Durdle Door and other Jurassic Coast sites.

Geology 

The cove has formed as a result of bands of rock of alternating geological resistance running parallel to the coastline (a concordant coastline). On the seaward side the clays and sands have been eroded.

A narrow (less than ) band of Portland limestone rocks forms the shoreline. Behind this is a narrow (less than ) band of slightly less-resistant Purbeck limestone.

Forming the back of the cove is a  band of chalk, which is considerably more resistant than the clays and sands, but less resistant than the limestones. The entrance to the cove is a narrow gap in the limestone bands, formed by wave action and weathering. The wide part of the cove is where the weak clays and greensands have been eroded.

The sea has made a gap in the Portland and Purbeck limestone here to the Wealden clays and begun eroding them.

Geography
The shape of the cove is a result of wave diffraction. The narrow entrance to the cove causes waves to bend into an arc shape, as is visible in the panorama photograph.

Conservation 
As well as the cove, across Hambury Tout (the large chalk hill to the west) is Durdle Door, a natural arch. To the east there is a fossilised forest. Lulworth is also close to Kimmeridge, famous for its rocky shore and fossils. Geologists and geographers have been interested in the area since the beginning of the 19th century, and in the 1830s the first serious study of the area took place. Since then the area has drawn students from all over the world.

The area suffers from trampling from its many visitors. Wooden steps, fences and steps have been put in place to limit this surface damage.  Each year over 250,000 people walk across the hill linking the cove to Durdle Door.

In 2001 the coast was granted World Heritage Site status by UNESCO. Experts at UNESCO have been working on preserving the shape of Lulworth Cove. Lulworth was one of a number of gateway villages on the coast with a Heritage Centre—part visitor centre, tourist information and natural history museum; in 2002 the last received 418,595 visitors.

The coast and land to the north and around the village is privately owned and managed by the Lulworth Estate. Land to the east is owned by the Ministry of Defence and used for tank training; it is open only at weekends and holidays.

In popular culture 
 Four Sided Triangle (1953)
 Nuts in May (1976)
 The Boys in Blue (1982)
 The Curse of Fenric (1989)
 Seven Natural Wonders (2005)
 Walking Through History (2013)
 World War Z (2013)

Miscellaneous 
The bay of Lulworth Sinus in the largest hydrocarbon sea, Kraken Mare, on Saturn's largest moon, Titan, is named after Lulworth Cove.

See also 
 Geology of Dorset
 List of Dorset beaches

References

External links 

 Geology of Stair Hole near Lulworth Cove
 The Lulworth Estate

Coves of Dorset
Geology of Dorset
Jurassic Coast
Tourist attractions in Dorset